Saint Mary, officially the Parish of Saint Mary, is a parish of Antigua and Barbuda on the island of Antigua. Saint Mary borders Saint John to the north, and Saint Paul to the east. Saint Mary is dominated by the Shekerley Mountains, and its northern border is largely defined by the mountains, and by Cooks Creek. The largest city in the parish is Bolands, home to the Jolly Harbour neighbourhood, and the parish church is located in Old Road. Saint Mary was created with the other five original parishes on 11 January 1692. It had a population of 7,341 in 2011, and 8,141 in 2018.

Saint Mary is located in the Pineapple Belt, the only place where the Antigua black pineapple can be grown.

History 
The Antigua Black Pineapple, regarded as the sweetest pineapple in the world, is almost exclusively grown in Saint Mary and Saint Paul thanks to the region's distinctive rainfall patterns and lengthy history in the agricultural sector.

Sugar Mills

Blubber Valley & Mosquito Cove 
In this location, there is no longer a mill.

Capt. John Lingham, who passed away in 1685, took control of the plantations Blubber Valley and Musketo Cove. In 1688, Kathryn Lingham rated 78 slaves and 850 acres. Capt. Henry Pearne, a member of St. Mary's Parish's vestry, was valued at 750 acres and 74 slaves in 1696. At St. Mary's Paris h, Col. Henry Pearne's estate was valued at 665 acres and 150 slaves in 1706. 1710: Robert Pearne (d. 1718) possessed 60 acres at Musketo Cove and 1200 acres at Blubber Valley. 1712: The 1200-acre Blubber Valley and Musquito Cove Plantations, which contain 100 black men, 20 black women, 20 black boys, and 20 black girls, are in the Court of King's Bench and Common Pleas Mary Lingham and the Guardians of Robert Pearne. John Dunbar resided at the Blubber Valley Plantation in 1737. When he married Lacey Chester, Parke's biological daughter, in 1737, Thomas Dunbar (d. 1734), of the Leeward Islands, adopted the name Parke (as specified in Daniel Parke II's bequest) and became Daniel Parke. Charles Dunbar, according to Parke's relatives, was one of those who killed the general. Elizabeth, Lucy, and Daniel were their three children. 1757: Robert Pearne (d. 1757) left half of his Antigua plantation to John Willes for life, followed by John Willes, his eldest son. To Chas. Spooner and his successors goes the remaining half. Dr. John Dunbar resided at Blubber Plantation in 1787. Along with Rose Valley, this Estate had 1164 acres and 240 slaves in 1829. Blubber Valley, &c. of 1164 acres is listed in the Antigua Almanac as being owned by the Heirs of F. T. Shaw in 1851. Blubber Plantation, which covered 165 acres, belonged to W. Dunbar in 1852. Gunthorpes Estates Ltd. underwent a restructuring on August 1, 1943 (see #64 Gunthorpes), and was called Antigua Syndicate Estates Ltd. The estates purchased by the Bennet-Bryson family for 39,000 pounds each were Sanderson's, Long Lane/Lavingtons/Ffryes, Burkes/LaRoche/Willis Freeman's, Jolly Hill (Jolly Hill, Blubber Valley, Ffryes, Montrose, Yorkes, and the Cove), Hawes and Mercer's Creek, Cochranes and Thomas's, and Jolly Hill. 1945: The Syndicate Estates decided to let Arthur Hallpike rent a coconut grove on the property in order to promote the growth of coconuts for pig feed.

The population of slaves on this estate fluctuated throughout time, reaching a peak of 240 people in 1829. According to this paperwork, there were "100 negro males, 20 women, 20 boys and 20 girls" on the 1200 acre Blubber Valley and Musquito Cove Plantations in 1712. There is not much information known about the people of this plantation.

Brook's 
On a lovely rocky hill where the buff formerly stood, overlooking Cades Bay and the nearby farms, the estate house's remnants are still visible. A beautiful ancient cotton tree stands to the Northeast, and the base of the old wind mill that was once used to pump water to the buff can still be seen in the middle of the pond. A wonderful old stone structure with 2-3' thick walls that was once a part of the estate is located directly to the north. After pineapples are harvested and before being sent to Central Marketing Corp., the Market, etc., chemicals are stored in this newly rebuilt facility.

Prior to the 1940s and 1950s, the structure was used to store cotton bales when the area produced sea island cotton. When not in use, the surrounding hamlet would utilize it as a community center for dances and concerts. To the back is a tiny stage. This facility served many functions and was well-used.

"Indenture between John Brooks and Christopher Baldwin of London" reads in part in 1777. "Grants all that plantation known as Cades Bay or Road Plantation, containing 350 acres, and all that plantation known as Morris's just purchased of Valentine Morris, containing 400 acres." Richard Oliver's first cousin, William Smith of Antigua, sold 260 acres known as "Oliver's" to the Langford Brookes in 1791. 1804: "Antiguan planter Thomas Burton. Will from May 30, 1804. To sell off my entire estate. To be free and receive 30c a year from the inheritance of John Brooke, Esq., and my three children by Nancy. To the aforementioned three kids and their mother, 100 pounds each. According to the Antigua Almanac from 1851, Henry Hill had 755 acres that were owned by Brookes & Morris. Cane Returns for the 1941 Harvest from Antigua Sugar Factory Ltd. Brook. estimated 328 tons, 18 acres of farmland were occupied by peasants, and 342 tons of cane were provided. 2004: "Our "National Fruit," the Antigua Black Pineapple, is depicted on our coat of arms. It has dark yellow meat that is very sweet and flavorful. The area known as the "Pineapple Belt" runs from Redhill to Bethesda and has volcanic soil all the way to Cades Bay. Pineapples are cultivated from suckers, which mature in 15 to 18 months and continue to bear fruit for around three years. Ten acres are currently farmed at the Government Station. 2005: At Urlings, there is a lovely old manse that is still abandoned and deteriorating. In the past five years, the bell in the picture has been taken (plunderer). The Museum has access to Rev. Reid's family's diaries, which describe his time serving St. Mary's Parish in the Old Road neighborhood in 1859. Antigua's tallest peak, Bogey Peak, which was renamed Mt. Obama shortly after President Obama of the United States was elected, is 1319 feet high. This serves as the setting for the estate, which once had a livestock operation. Below the hamlet of Liberta, there is another Brooks estate identified as Brook's Liberta #82.

Christian Valley / Biffins 
In the years 1746–1748, Samuel Redhead is listed as having land in Willoughby Bay but is not visible on the map. Both Thomas Redhead, Esq. and Dr. William Redhead, who own property in Old North Sound, are listed. For 20,000 pounds, Samuel Redhead (d. 1712) bought Frye's 420 acres. 1775: Mathew Christian acquired a number of estates in Antigua, including those at Biffins (200 acres), Red Hill (400 acres), Elme's (158 acres), and Windward (180 acres). 1778 — died in London. Robert Christian's son passed away in Antigua in 1776. It is thought that he arrived in London from Antigua in the year 1777, and by the year 1778, he was residing in Southampton-street, Strand, in the city of Westminster, where he passed away. His sister Margaret was married to William Gunthorpe of Antigua, and he had a brother named John who passed away there long before 1777. John Luffman's 1777–1778 map depicts a "Biffens" near McNish that is held by Ledwell & Scott. 1779: Mathew Christian held 200 acres in the New Division, the Old Road Division, and the Parish of St. Mary. Matthew Christian, successor to his uncle Matthew, who died in 1779, owned the following properties: Red Hill, 410 acres; Bevans, 200 acres; The Valley, 350 acres; Huyghues, 200 acres; and Elmes, 149 and 180 acres. 9 Antigua For 198 slaves, Christian Valley & Biffins received 2746 pounds 7 s 2 d. Just William Shand received an award. Christian Valley had a Jack-o-Lantern story as told: "One of Robert Paige's sons, George Paige, of Christian Hill, claimed to have a clear memory of witnessing weird occurrences over their farm. When he and his brothers were in their early teens, they could often see a lot of lights hovering around their house on their way home after attending confirmation at the Bethesda Methodist Church, "like the house was on fire and the fire was going round and round like people carrying torches when crab hunting." He claimed that as they neared, the lights would move southwestward across the Bowens' land before disappearing. He asserted that he thinks the creatures were attempting to safeguard Mathew Christian, the land's original (plantation) owner, from harm."

Claremont 
The mill is no longer there, and the estate home is the only building still surviving in the mountains. Not even the approach up the mountain and through a stone gated arch with stone walls can rival how magnificently located it is. The vistas are breathtaking. The "Claremont Estate," which is now a National Trust estate and is located southwest of London, is supposed to be where the name Claremont may have originated. The Williams family, who were connected to Claremont in Antigua, resided there and originated from a region close to the estate in England. The Duke of Newcastle owned Claremont from 1714 until his death in 1769, Lord Robert Clive of India owned it from 1769 until his death in 1886, and Queen Victoria owned it from 1865 until her death in 1901. Currently, the region is one of two farms on the island growing the Antigua Black Pineapple, with the Browne family owning the other. The estate mansion, which was accidently partially burned during the filming of the movie "Fire Power," was used in the scene. Even today, the land is surrounded by concrete cannons and movie-related "props," and what is left of the once-impressive structure is no longer recognizable. The estate bell, which used to be outside in front, was taken (stolen) around 2006, and goats wander freely around the property. At the beach below, not far from the Cades Bay property, there are still two stone buildings that were likely lime kilns used to heat conch shells that were ground into lime to create a product akin to cement. To produce the lime used in the mortar for construction, every estate along the sea had one or more kilns.

Williams made his home in Old Road in the parish of St. Mary. The first male white kid to be born on the island, Col. Rowland Williams, received a patent for 300 acres in 1668. 1675: "Colonel Rowland Williams was chosen to serve as Antigua's vice governor. This man had outstanding qualifications that distinguished him honorably from his peers. He was notable for being both a knowledgeable councilor and a skilled commander; he was deserving of praise in both the senate and on the battlefield. The Hon. Rowland E. Williams, the current owner of "Claremont," the family mansion, embodies the great values that Colonel Williams' father, one of Antigua's original immigrants, was known for. These virtues have been passed down from father to son down to the present day. He was interred in the church in Old Road in 1713 after living for 80 years, and his epitaph is located there. It is written in Latin and is quite long, celebrating his qualities. On page 183, there is an English translation. Edward Williams, Esq., at Tom Moore's Plantation, Road Division, 120 acres and 50 acres, 1743. The 150-acre Cistern Plantation and the 954 1/2-acre Road Plantation. Surveyed on September 19, 1743. Mrs. Rachel Russell owned the 120 acres in Cistern, which were bordered by Tom Moore's, Road Plantation, and Gardiners. Ginger ground up was produced in "cisterns". "In trust for Rowland Edward Williams and his heirs, I give my three plantations, The Road, The Upper, or Tom Moore's, and The Cistern, all in St. Mary's Parish, to my trustees." Rowland Edward Louis Charles Williams, Antigua's Puisne Baron of Exchequer, was a member of council in 1784. Captain 10th Hussars; born in April 1784; buried at St. Mary's on June 2, 1852, at age 68. His ancestral home was known as "Claremont". 938 acres and 252 slaves were present on this estate (Claremont) in 1829 when it was merged with The Mountain. Rowland E. Williams owns the 938-acre "Mountain" in St. Mary's Parish. Rowland E. Williams owned Claremont and Mountain, which measured 938 acres, according to the Antigua Almanac from 1851. Rowland Claremont Antigua's William Edwards. Vere Oliver, Volume III, page 237 "The first sugar mill tower was built up at Clairmont on Old Road in 1670 or thereabouts," writes Sammy Smith in "To Shot Hard Labor," page 108. Although it was a very modest mill, it was located in what was supposedly the best region in the country, so perhaps that is why they began the process there. I've also heard that there, water wasn't a big issue. That side houses the well-known Tom Moor Spring. Ross served as the Shand estates' attorney and manager. There were four of them: Cades Bay (#191), Claremont, Cassada Gardens, and Cedar Valley (#42). "Periodically traveling to the south to oversee the Claremont estate was William McSevney of Diamond estate. Although my grandmother Margaret Conacher, who lived in town, said it was delightful when he would return, bringing with him the fresh pineapples and mangoes of the countryside, his wife was not thrilled about having him so far away from home." On the combined estates of Tremontaine and Claremont in 1829, there were 252 slaves at work.

Douglas’s Estate – Ravenscroft 
Walter Nisbet leased Mr. Harvey the Douglas Estates in 1787–1788. James Douglas lived from 1703 to 1787. "Sir I have given directions for another Copy of the Plan of Sir George Douglas' Properties with those of Mr. Harvey's called Yeamons, laying upon the West line...." List of Black People Belonging to "His Plantation Leased to Robt. Harvey Esq." "Ravenscroft" Plantation of the late Henry Douglas in the Division of Old Road & Parish of St. Mary, Antigua, contains 210 acres and is bordered to the east by the lands of William Young Esq. and Francis Farley Esq., to the west by the lands of John Brooke, Esq., formerly of John Pollington, Esq., to the north by the ridge of mountains, and to the south by the lands of Valentine Morris Esq. Ken Charles Douglas Estates, from 1739 to 1795. "Sir, as stated above, you were informed of Doctor Mid. McNamara's passing and..... the Estate, which as a result of his passing, is your property. ...... The water to drink in many sections of the country is provided by the Navy, who keep Crafts constantly employed to transport the water from your Spring, even though Every Estate in this Island has failed. A spring on the Douglas plantation is seen on the Baker map from 1746–1747 to the west of Cades Bay, and on the estate's plan, ships are represented just offshore from the spring's location. Douglas Estate in Antigua, 1767–1804. Account for estates. Richard Neave served as the estate's receiver for I.S. Douglas, Esq., in 1787. Walter Nisbet wrote a letter to Sir George Douglas around 1787–1788.

"Dear Sir, I came here two days ago after a quick and enjoyable journey from Nevis. Having a lot to say to you about your affairs in Antigua, I would have been overjoyed to run across you in town. I toured your estate, and I can only say that it is among the nicest on the island in terms of size and has one of the best-established creole gangs of Black people I have ever seen.

Walter Nisbet leased the Douglas Estates to Mr. Harvey between 1787 and 1788.

"An Account of the Quantity of Sugar Made on the Joint Estates of Sir George Douglas and Robert Farquar in the Island of Antigua, for the last ten years from the years 1805 to 1814, both years inclusive; The Former consists of about 510 Acres, in which there are about 220 Acres of Cane Land and about 209 Negroes of all descriptions, a significant portion of whom are children, or old and Superannuated. According to the most recent returns, there were 164 Black people living on the latter's approximately 300 acres, 110 acres of cane land, and a total of 373 Black people living on both estates, which have been operated as one plantation for the past 56 years while they have been under Mr. Farquar and his family's ownership. The amount of land is simply given from memory and may not be exact, but the number of black people and the amount of sugar produced are exact numbers and quantities. Crop yield in 1805 from sugar was.54 Hhds. 10 Years 458 Averages 75 Hhds in 1806; 70 in 1807; 60 in 1808; 40 in 1809; 30 in 1810; 110 in 1811; 64 in 1812; and 150 in 1813."

Ffry’s 
Another estate of 320 acres was called "Ffryes" (#118) in St. Philip's Parish, while "Fry's Pasture" (#157) was located in St. John's Parish. The fact that the same person owned 4-6 homes on the island and that each acquired their name makes this not rare, although it may be very confusing. Two mills exist, one on a hill with a stunning wall and a view of the beach to the west, and the other on a level area to the east. Only one-half of the original mill remains in the latter. A park, nursery, and vacation cottages have recently been built on three acres that had housed one mill and the ruins of the works. At the Coco's hotel, at the northern end of the beach, are the ruins of a stone circle. This does not appear to have been a mill, but rather a lime kiln, which was used by all estates by the sea. Lieut. John Fry acquired 190 acres in Bermudian Valley in 1677, on behalf of his wife Mary and originally owned by Captain William Kyn. Capt. John Fry was assigned 992 acres and 70 slaves in 1682. In his will dated 1669, Alexander Pollington named Master John Frye as the manager of his plantation in Antigua's Leeward Division. In 1696, he owned 1000 acres and 72 slaves. Col. John Fry assessed 103 slaves and 570 acres in 1706. 1718: On March 31, John Ffrye filed a petition claiming ownership of 588 acres in the Bermudian Valley bordered on the south by Mr. Samuel Ffrye and the salt pond, on the east by Samuel Ffrye, and on the northeast by Samuel Ffrye, etc. "Petition prays for a grant of certain fish ponds, mangroves, and flashes in the first plantation. It also asks for permission to build a pier at his landing site, which is 60 feet out into the water from the low water mark and 100 feet long. Patent issued. 1852: Eliza F. Spencer possessed the 543-acre Ffryes estate in the Bermudian Valley in St. Mary's Parish. Willock's and Upper Ffry's of 518 acres are listed in the 1878 Almanac as belonging to Richard Abbott's heirs. William Manning, a landowner in St. Kitts and a West India merchant, was the father of Charles J. Manning in 1878. He was an influential member of the West India Lobby and the MP for Lymington, Evesham, and Penryn.

The following information is recorded in a ledger in Willoughby Bay Old Churchyard: "Here lye the Remains of John Ffry Esq./One of His Majesty's Council of this Ifland/A man too Worthy/in his Life and Manners/To be left to Remembrance/He left this life 6th March 1747/Aged 78."

Fryes received 3251 lbs 0s 10d in compensation for 208 slaves. The single recipient was Elizabeth Frances Spencer (née Newton).

Green Castle 
The estate home was located on a hill, below the rise where the two mills were located, but above the valley. A house has been constructed there today, not far from an antique cistern with a concave top. Only the road that curved around the estate home at the top of the hill, which is now hidden by vegetation, is left. Mr. Raymond Morris (1921–2016) resided in a home on the property beneath the bluff hill, next to a former cistern and roughly where the two windmills used to be. He grew up on the estate and recalled that Bones, a Barbadian, served as the estate's final manager from 1933 to 1934. Bones resided in the estate home. Up to the 1928 hurricane, which was a particularly devastating one and of which he has vivid memories, his mother worked in the fields, and he lived there with his mother and brother in one of two long structures with five rooms, of which they occupied one. A cast iron boiler now waters the cattle, and the wheel from a bullock cart sticking out of the ground is used to tie animals. Underneath the house are the ruins of a stone building that might have been the boiling house close to the pond. Mr. Morris pointed out the location of the blacksmith shop, where all of the estate's metal work was done, from shoeing horses to making tools and cart wheels. When the water level in the pond is low, the ruins of a pump can also be seen there.

1676: "George Martin fled from Belfast to the English colony of Surinam in South America to escape the fury of Cromwell's army, while his son Samuel, who may have been born in Surinam, went to Antigua at some point after the Peace of Breda in 1667." Samuel Martin was married three times: the first time to Katherine Revenscroft (? ), who died in 1690; the second time to Frances Kaynell, widow of Christopher Kaynell, who died in 1690 (he spent little time); and the third time to Lydia Thomas, whose will was proved in 1747. The next sentence makes reference to Sir Henry Martin, who was Lydia's son and the inheritor of Green Castle. For some reason, Col. Samuel Martin, Speaker of the House of Assembly, denied his slaves their customary Christmas holiday in 1701 and had them work instead. They got up in unison in the middle of the night, broke in, and practically hacked him to death. Mrs. Martin sought refuge in a nearby cane field out of fear for the same horrific fate until she could entrust her children's safety to friends. The criminals were brought to account. Later, Mrs. Martin wed Gov. Byam. “1701 Dec.30. The Assembly convened to consider "the recent horrendous murder of the Hon. Samuel Martin, Esq., by his own slaves," and it was decided to distribute 1000 cartridges to each company captain and store 10,000 in the magazine.

Col. Samuel Martin's second child from his second marriage, Josiah Martin (b.1772), was really born in Dublin, Ireland, on April 22, 1737, as opposed to Antigua, as some writers have mistakenly claimed. The colonel had hoped that after his death, his son would manage his plantation while running a mercantile enterprise, but this was not to be. He enlisted in the Antiguan militia at the age of 17 in 1754, and when the war between Great Britain and France broke out in 1756, he was promoted to ensign in the Fourth Foot regiment. Josiah spent several years traveling back and forth between Long Island, New York, and Antigua because the island did not seem to be healthy for him. He and his wife had eight children, and in 1770 he was appointed governor of North Carolina. Nevertheless, in July 1775, he was forced to seek safety on a vessel at Wilmington. The eldest child and heir of Maj. Samuel Martin and Lydia (Tomlinson) Martin, Col. Samuel Martin (1693–1777) was born in Antigua. Samuel was transferred to live with relatives in Ireland after his father unexpectedly passed away at the hands of his slaves. He was accepted as a fellow commoner at Trinity College, Cambridge, when he was sixteen years old. He wed Frances, the daughter of John Yeamans, the island's vice governor, in 1713 after returning to Antigua. Their union gave birth to Samuel Martin, Jr. (1714–1788), a member of Parliament and joint secretary of the Treasury. Col. Samuel Martin's estate had 291 slaves and 605 acres in 1767. Col. Martin, who died in 1780, was rated on 605 acres and 306 slaves. 1774–1776: "...the most delightful character I have ever yet met with, that of Coll. Martin, the loved and adored father of Antigua, to whom it owed a thousand advantages, and whose age is still daily occupied to render it more improved and joyful. One of the oldest families on the island, they reside on estates that a sizable group of healthy black people cultivate to the best of their ability. Their kind and loving master imposes labor upon them, which they gladly do. They appear to be the subjects of a good ruler, not the slaves of a plantation owner, being well fed and supported. He claimed to have not purchased a slave in more than twenty years and that, on the morning of our arrival, he had received a report on the condition of his estates, where no fewer than fifty-two pregnant wenches were present. These slaves, who were raised locally and are accustomed to the climate, are by far the most valuable and hardly ever suffer from the illnesses that result in such high loss rates that hundreds of people are compelled to be sent to the island every year." "It is a maxim of his that no slave can render that acceptable service he wishes from those immediately about himself, and for that reason he made them free. The quickness with which they serve him, and the love they bear him, show he is not wrong. We now had fruit, sangria, and beverage brought to us instead of by slaves." "The patriot is already setting an example by turning many of the plantations into grass, allowing them to rest and recover the strength they have lost due to too many sugar crops, and by doing so is able to rear cattle, which he has done with great success. "He wishes to have his dear little Antigua independent; he regrets the many Articles she is forced to trust to foreign aid. His lawns were home to some of the finest cows I have ever seen, and his own oxen are already pulling his wagons." An essay on plantership by Col. Martin was published in Antigua about 1755, and in England in 1763 and 1765. A copy of this 62-page original work, the only one of its sort, can be located in the Museum of Antigua & Barbuda's Archives. On his plantation, he aimed to adopt fresh techniques and equipment for husbandry. He repaired and increased the efficiency of his sugar works and rum distillery; he conducted crop rotation, fallowing, and marling; and he divided the labor of his slaves according to their age, sex, strength, talent, and temperament. He felt that slaves should receive unrestricted access to food, clothes, housing, and medical treatment for reasons of interest and humanity. Greencastle was home to 304 black people in 1768. Martin's 605-acre plantation, which was huge by historical standards, was valued at 30,000 pounds sterling when the slaves, sugar mills, animals, and other equipment were all included. An estimated 25,000 of the 37,000 slaves on the 108 square mile island of Antigua were reportedly employed on more than 300 farms in 1764. The number of people of European ancestry decreased to about 2,500 by 1775, but the slave population grew. Greencastle had 315 slaves and 895 acres in 1829. "Green Castle, which spans 940 acres, is located about three miles to the southeast of St. John's. The home commands a panoramic view of the island as it sits atop a rocky cliff overlooking the grounds. A valley, dotted with fields of sugarcane and other crops, extends in one way. In another, a series of hills can be seen, their tops clouded over and their sides covered with vegetation. The sugar cottages are located at the base of the rock. The negro settlement, with the supply grounds behind it, is located on a nearby highland. The manager, Samuel Barnard, Esq., welcomed us warmly. He currently oversees two estates, serves as the attorney for six others, and recently bought his own estate. After surviving the devastation of slavery and being deposed as a tyrant, he continues to live among the people who were once his slaves and runs an estate that was once his dominion. Such a man's testimony is quite valuable.

 According to Mr. B, when the slaves on this island gained their freedom, they were remarkably peaceful.
 He claimed that after giving his people their independence, he had no trouble persuading them to work. Several estates had experienced temporary hardship; for a month or two, there had been a fairly significant fluctuation as individuals moved from one estate to another. But, this was due to the foolishness of the planters, who overbid each other to acquire the best workers and a sufficient number of them. The black people had a deep sense of commitment to their houses and only seldom left them unless they were being mistreated.
 He believed that by rejecting apprenticeship, the Assembly made a very sensible decision. He thought it ridiculous. It enslaved them both by taking some of the slave's chains and fastening them to the master. It took away the latter's ability to compel labor, while giving the former no means of encouraging industry.

Mr. G.S. Martin owned Mount Pleasant in St. John's parish in 1852. The heirs of Samuel Martin possessed High Point 212 acres and Nibbs 131 acres in St. George's Parish, while Sir. W. Martin controlled Green Castle 605 acres and Rigby's 263 acres in St. Mary's Parish. The Clara, carrying 100 Chinese men, landed at Antigua on February 1, 1882. With 128 people on board when it departed Hong Kong, the captain reported that 28 of them had passed away. The Antigua Times reported that day that the reception to their arrival was not very enthusiastic. This group of 100 male Chinese immigrants did not adapt well to Antigua and were said to have "vowed vengeance against the Chinese doctor and interpreter who came with them; believing that they.. had been in collusion with the enlisting agent to mislead them" over a dispute regarding the payment of wages. The Antigua Times stated on January 17, 1883, that "Chinese from numerous estates congregated at the Tomlinsons on Sunday, and discussed with each other... and they agreed that some 9 planters against whom they have some ill feeling, should be subject to death." Mr. Look Lai demonstrates how "fire of properties" was mentioned in the same newspaper item. Look Lai demonstrates this in a passage from the Colonial Correspondence, where the Governor, Sir J.H. Glover, reported that two Chinese laborers, Lee Sung and Ah Kung, were put to death on January 29, 1883, inside the walls of the gaol for the murder of Mr. Augustus Lee, the estate manager of Green Castle, in that city. The Fryer's Concretor method of processing sugar was introduced some 15 years ago, according to the 1885 Horsford Almanac, but it has not been as widely adopted as may have been expected despite being a sufficiently feasible notion, successfully implemented, and carried out with great competence. 1887: "15th - John went to the office early this morning because he thought the mail would be delivered between 9 and 10, but there was such a swell going on that it took until 12:30pm for the mail to be delivered. Mrs. R. sent me a message in the afternoon asking me to accompany her and K. to Bendals so they could visit Mrs. Cowie. We took the Green Castle route home. We disembarked the carriage at the bottom of the hill and proceeded to climb it to view what was left of the lovely old mansion. Now, it is a total wreck. He is confident that the fields Nos. 16, 17, 18, 19, 20, and 21 once belonging to Bath Lodge before becoming a part of Green Castle were utilized for gambling among the plantocracy. On the slopes of Green Castle, Mr. Morris (d. 2016) continues to tend to his cattle, frequently tethering them to artifacts from the estate's earlier days, including the strut of a wagon wheel. A very intriguing old brick ruin that might have been a part of the water system is located on the northern lip of the hill, close to the road, and the pond at the bottom of the hill is rumored to be very deep. Over the years, Mr. Morris claimed to have received multiple visits from England cousins of the Martin family who had come to see the property. After Green Castle declared bankruptcy in 1929 or 1930, the government had the land marked off and divided into two sections. Following soil testing, the property was resurveyed into private and leasehold areas, with the more arable areas going into private ownership while the less productive ones were leased. Maloney was the initial purchaser of the private land, which he later sold to Michael, John Isaac Martin, and then back to the government. Due to the impressive megaliths that still survive from prehistoric times, Greencastle Hill to the south has been designated a National Heritage site. This is Antigua's own "tropical Stonehenge," which resembles the stones of Stonehenge but is smaller. William Forrest sent pictures to the head of the Glasgow Archaeological Society in the early 1900s, who responded by calling them "a prehistoric astronomical apparatus for the purpose of recording time." In the 1930s, Charlesworth Ross believed it to be a place of pagan worship. Amazing Arawak artifacts were discovered at the location by Fred Olson (Mill Reef) in the 1950s, who thought the megaliths were natural formations. The Green Castle Hill megaliths are undoubtedly distinctive and continue to spark a lot of discussion. But, the constantly advancing quarry operated by Antigua Masonry Products on the NE face and the recent addition of a smaller quarry on the west put them in jeopardy. The burial of the Second Earl Baldwin of Bewdley, vice admiral and governor of the Leeward Islands from 1948 to 1950, is located on Greencastle Hill's highest point, above the quarry. He cherished Antigua and its people, so when he passed away, he requested to be buried on Greencastle Hill. The inscription on his headstone reads as follows. Someone must still go to the grave since in 2008, when workers were ascending, a bible that had been propped open with a stone lay on the grave.

"Here are the ashes of Oliver Ridgedale, Second Earl Baldwin of Bewdley, who served as governor, commander in chief, and vice admiral of the Leeward Islands from 1948 to 1950. He was born on March 1 and died on August 11, 1958."

Greencastle, 1941: Cane Returns for the 1941 Harvest from Antigua Sugar Factory Ltd. (Govt). Estimated 2910 tons, 197 acres of farmland occupied by peasants, and 2051 tons of cane provided. The company Antigua Masonry Products Ltd. was formerly a division of Devcon International Inc. and was established in 1974. It manufactures and provides concrete blocks, ready-mixed concrete, mortar mix, boulders, sand, and bagged cement. For 319 slaves, Green Castle received £4,454 2s 6d in compensation. Only Sir Henry William Martin 2nd Bart received the honor. Due to unreasonable labor expectations during their Christmas holiday, the first group of enslaved people at Green Castle assassinated the plantation owner. We know that all of the murderers were "made an example of" and put to death. Moreover, there were 316 slaves working on the estate at its peak. The peoples that lived in Greencastle as slaves are not well-known.

Hermitage 
At the northern end of Hermitage beach, around the rocky headland, there is still a mill that may be reached through a trail down the seafront. It is best seen from a boat on the water. This estate didn't adopt steam technology. The Leper Colony, also known as the Lazarette, was founded on Rat Island with assistance from the government in 1837 and relocated to Pearns Point in the early 1930s (near Hermitage to the south). As leprosy was no longer a disease to be feared on the island, around 1960, the Home was abandoned. The entire area has evolved into a highly upscale residential neighborhood. A brand-new, opulent hotel complex called the "Hermitage Hotel" was constructed on Hermitage Bay in 2007, engulfing the hillside and two-thirds of the beach while leaving the remaining third free to the public. In 2013, the beach underwent a significant transformation. A ledge of granite is now nearly always visible along the beach, 5 to 10 feet out to sea. After a storm, several great species of shells can still be found at what used to be one of the island's top shelling beaches. At St. Mary's Parish, Lieutenant George Leonard rated on 16 slaves and 62 acres on June 7, 1706. Capt. George Leonard served as the ruler of Anguilla in 1716. A number of members of the Leonard family are buried in Valley Churchyard. George Leonard was rated in St. Mary's Parish in 1767 on 47 slaves and 128 acres. George Leonard of Tortola, Esq., and of The Hermitage, Antigua, "d.1799," according to the record. 1829: This plantation, which had 117 acres, and the Jolly Hill estate may have shared slaves at the time. An intriguing quotation shows "traded with Rogers and laid at anchor for about 20 days, and he knew the things he bought were of some of Capt. Kidd's." This was in January 1706. On Anguilla, Capt. Kidd's boat was docked, and he spent roughly a week there at anchor. Rogers owes Leonard 300 percent of his loan. Some people were trading with pirates, and one John King even bought an estate in St. Christopher as a result of trade with pirates, the article continues. Thomas Coull, MD, owned "Crabbs" (#73), a 400-acre property, as well as The Hermitage (St. Mary's), a 117-acre property, in 1852. "Belonged to the Leonards in 1788, and Thomas Coull, MD, possessed the 117 acres in 1852." In addition, Thomas Coull MD owned the 311-acre St. Peter's parish properties Hawes (#78b) and Mercer's Creek (#78). A memorial tablet in black and white can be found on the north wall of St. George's church, where he was laid to rest.

"The successors of Jacob and Grace Francis (our grandparents from Greenbay, Antigua, W.I.) formed Hermitage Enterprises as a partnership or corporation, among other things, as was stated in the preamble. The Will stated clearly that the Estate "will pass down to posterity" and not be sold."

"The property that no one wanted to use for sugar farming due to the hills and soil depletion became available to any "ambitious ex-slave" or "free man of color" when the planters gave up their objections after much wrangling. The cost per acre ranged from 8 to 120 pounds sterling depending on the circumstances, fertility, and proximity to markets. Because of the difficult terrain, solitude among the hills, and distance from Gunthorpes, the main depot for the sugarcane, Hermitage was one of the less expensive locations. The two hills, Jumbie Hill and Georgie Hill, are a component of the "Sleeping Indian" hill range."

Money was limited at the time, but the pooling or flinging of box money increased the meager income from crops. You see, at the time, nine pence per person, per week, for ten weeks, from ten persons, would equal three pounds and fifteen shillings. Instead of using his "box hand," he saved it to aid in achieving his goal. His holdings, which included "The Spring Piece," "The Simon Hill," "The Brown Piece," "White Wood," and "Ellis Piece," would eventually grow as he was able to pay for his plots as they became available."

"The beach on Hermitage's southern side is one of the prettiest beaches in the world. It goes by a number of names, some of which are extremely contentious, like Lime Kiln Bay and Mosquito Cove. When Elizabeth II traveled to Antigua, she only ever went swimming in salt water at Royal Cove beach."

"The homes at Hermitage were essentially what we referred to as "Watch Houses" back then. They had four wooden sides and a roof made of intertwined sticks and coconut palm leaves that had been painted with mud and baked in the sun. These homes, most of which had densely packed mud floors, were known as "wattle-and-daubed" homes. These constructions are no longer there."

"Moses Francis, who was born about 1858 and died in 1938, was one of Antigua's first significant black landowners only 24 years after slavery was abolished. A descendant goes on to describe the histories of Hermitage and Hawkes Bill Estate in further detail."

The estate's owner received 1620 pounds 5s 5d in compensation in 1829 for the release of the 107 slaves who were employed there at the time. One particularly intriguing aspect of this plantation is that Moses Francis (1858–1938), one of Antigua's first black landowners of priority land, acquired it only 24 years after the British abolished slavery. Moses Francis was one of Antigua's first black landowners of priority land. Not much is known about those who were enslaved at this plantation.

Hermitage received 1620 pounds 5s 5d in compensation for 107 slaves. Thomas Coull was the lone winner.

Jolly Hill 
At this location, there is no longer a mill or other obvious remains of the operations. Despite being in a terrible shape, the estate home that sits atop the hill and offers a stunning view of Jolly Harbour and Hermitage to the west still survives. It was bought by an American, Mr. Paul Denkler, in the 1960s, and after renovation, it was quite the showpiece. Even if one can drive around to the rear, it is extremely uncommon with the staircase approaching the front. The entry off the main road is marked by two stone pillars and an iron gate. At the base of the hill, directly to the north of the estate house, there are four grave markers in a walled cemetery. In Loving Memory of Margaret Annie Peters, wife of Entwhistle Peters, of Jolly Hill, who died in 1929 at the age of 33, according to one of the grave markers. also "Let me Rest Near the House I Loved So Well/There And My Living Love Shall Guide You Still/To Our Last Long Home Above." The wall and gate leading into the small cemetery, as well as the graves, are in excellent condition, but they are not yet old enough to have suffered significant degradation. To George Turney and his heirs, Thomas Horsnell mortgages his interest in Jolly Hill in 1686. General Codrington receives 300 acres from Henry Pearne in 1695 as a gift from Jolly Hill Plantation. By indenture, George Turney, a merchant, Sarah Turney, a widow, and Anthony Turney surrender their claim to half of Jolly Hill, which is made up of 200 acres, to William Codrington and Valentine Morris. Valentine Morris asks for a tax exemption on 143 acres of salt flashes that are a part of his Jolly Hill plantation in the years 1711–1712. Granted.” 1767: "Indenture 1767 between Valentine Morris and all those plantations in St. Mary's Parish known as Jolly Hill Plantation, containing and incorporating Mangroves and Flashes, 450 acres; all of said last named plantations are now under the tenure of Martin Blake."

Eliot & Horsford's appraisal of Jolly Hill in 1783 reads as follows:

 With cattle and utensils, 238 slaves cost 13,879 pounds, for a total of 17,000 pounds. 
 35 pounds per acre on 62 acres of good land is 2,170 pounds. 
 20 acres unusable, suitable for farming at 10 pounds per acre, or 200 pounds 414 pounds for 69 acres of pasture at 6 pounds per acre; 912 pounds for 456 acres of grassland, woodlands, and marshes at 40 cents per acre. 
 3 696 pounds worth of value was placed on 697 acres. 
 There are 2,518 buildings and jobs. 
 22,215 pounds are estimated to be the estate's overall market value.

The land was appraised at a low amount because the valuers believed the estate would never be profitable as a sugar farm.

About 1801, Charles Curtis served as Samuel Martin's manager at High Point. Sam Martin served as Bertie Entwhistle's trustee during his lifetime in 1812. As a result of this link, Charles Curtis also oversaw the management of Entwhistle's estates, including Golden Grove, Barnacle Point, and Jolly Hill. In 1822, Charles Curtis made his way back to London. A box of communication between Curtis and Samuel Martin recently came into the ownership of Curtis' relative Janet Richards, and it is currently being digitized. 1830: Liverpool Record Office holds the estate rentals and letter book of Ralph Peters, an Antigua sugar plantation owner; no citation is provided. This estate had 708 acres in 1852. Extract from a letter Robert Jefferson wrote to his brother Henry in 1861.

"Golden Grove. Jolly Hill. I have read Willis' response to your letter, but other some notes from John Gray Law, there have been no more applications for the lease in any way. The Bisphams promised they would pay the half-year rent due in February when they realized the mortgage on Bendalls, but they have yet to do so. I was very happy to agree to Law's suggestion that we ride around the estates, which we did last Saturday. I have been paying astronomical wages for weeding lately, so I was happy to have the chance to check with him to see if they have been properly expanded. We found the sprouts to be very clean and obviously forward-looking for next year, but there are two pieces near the gut at Jolly Hill which they are currently cutting, splendid cane but quite spoilt with the wet, being one half rotten. Cover the Rent Law lunched with me yesterday and was very keen that I should make an offer to lease the Estates but this I declined doing though I should so much like to get rid of these Bisphams. If the rent is unpaid the Lessors may enter upon the Estates at any time but Law holds no Power of Attorney to do so & so merely advises Willis at home. Our situation with this is still a difficult one because all of my calculations regarding the covenant I entered into are frustrated by the bad weather we've had. With a good ordinary season, our account would have been realized or very close to it by the crops, but I don't see more than 330 pounds sterling wiped off up to this point by calculation being very little more than when I wrote you on May 11th."

Jolly Hill, a 708-acre tract owned by Thomas Peters and leased to George W. Bennett in 1878, is depicted during this time. 1921: 2,393 acres in 1921. Leasing out plantations was a frequent practice, especially if the owner was an absentee landlord, did not live on the island, or owned multiple estates. Lease terms were laid up in indentures, which were frequently for a year.

"Two of my excellent lands in Antigua were taken possession of by the Assignees of a Mortgage for the full nominal price of the original mortgage," Valentine Morris stated in his Narrative. Another sizable estate on that island—where I was born and where the rest of my family now resides—was compelled to be sold under adverse circumstances for less than 13,000 pounds, despite the fact that most realistic estimates had routinely placed its value at 30,000 pounds.

"Valentine Morris Jr. had a sizable inheritance from his father, which he spent on a lavish lifestyle. On St. Vincent, the island he later became governor of, one of his pals was appointed lieutenant governor. After the French captured St. Vincent, he eventually traveled back to England where he filed numerous lawsuits against the government for money he had advanced for public service. His gorgeous wife went nuts from suffering and pain as he toiled for six or seven years in the King's Bench prison. Three years before his death in August 1789, his allies were able to secure his release."

Antigua Sugar Plant Ltd. returns cane for the 1941 harvest. 4497 tons estimated, 230 acres estate, 40 acres of land occupied by peasants, and 3107 tons of cane provided at a rate of 12.19 tons per acre. The Antigua and Barbuda Syndicate Estates Limited (Vesting) Act and the Lands of Antigua and Barbuda Sugar Factories Limited were both passed on December 30, 1969. According to Certificate of Title No. 1311951, dated February 18, 1951, and registered in Register Book S Folio 108, all that land, or parcel, that is a part of Jolly Hill, measures roughly 918.321 acres. Isaac Hawkins was a prosperous Antiguan in the 1980s. According to the legend, a woman cared for him, laundered his clothes, and cooked for him when he was hospitalized and sick at Holberton. After he recovered and was allowed to go home, he requested her to join him so that she could keep helping. She consented without knowing his status and anticipated a modestly-priced tiny house. She wasn't expecting to be taken to Jolly Hill buff home. She received support after Mr. Hawkins passed away thanks to his bequest, and she will stay at Jolly Hill until she passes away. Jolly Hill received 1804 14s 2d in compensation for 240 slaves. Rev. James Curtin received the single award. In 1783, there were 238 slaves employed on this estate; during the next nearly 50 years, that number only rose to 240. At that time, slavery was prohibited in the Caribbean, and Jolly Hill received 1804 pounds 14s 2d as compensation for the liberation of those 240 people. For people who were held as slaves on this property, little is known.

Mill Hill 
There is no longer a mill at this location, and it was hard to search for additional signs of plantation inhabitants because to the exceedingly deep bush. George Turney received 132 acres from Sir James Russell in 1673. John Luffman's map from 1777 to 1778 depicts "Mill Hill," but not the owner. Lockhart Russell was rated on 199 acres in 1780. Col. Philip Warner donated Hon. Lieut.-Col. Randolph Russell 511 acres in Antigua in 1676. (his cousin). Valentine Russell received a patent in Falmouth for 511 acres in 1678. A patent for 1050 acres and a second grant for 100 acres of flashings were given in 1680 by Sir James Russell and Nicholas Raynsford. Sir James Russell left his wife, who would become the ex-trix, half of his estate in Antigua and half to his three daughters in his will dated 1688. In 1767, James Russell was rated on 300 acres and 153 slaves. Indenture from 1773 states: ".....all that plantation known as Young's Lane of 40 acres in the Parish of St. Mary's, Antigua, with 175 slaves upon it, and their other plantation in the division of Old Road in Antigua.... (between Lockhart Russell and John Russell). 1790: "An account of the plot among the slaves on the plantation of the Hon. Lockhart Russell found on page 609 of the Gent Mag. Inheriting from his uncle Lockart Russell, Francis Russell of Blackhall, co. Kincardine, N.B., is the owner of "Mill Hill," a property with 333 acres, and "Gardeners," a property on Old Road, Antigua. Francis Russell bequeathed his entire estate, including Mill Hill and Gardiners in Old Road Division, to his wife Mary Bannerman in 1807. 1852: Edward Lipscombe owned "Mill Hill," which at the time had 333 acres and was located in St. Mary's Parish. Mill Hill received 2301 lsd 15s 3d in compensation for 161 slaves. The awardees were Mary Russell, John Grant ‘other association and unsuccessful was George Fraser. 20,160 gallons of water were piped daily from a nearby spring to St. John's starting on June 15th, 1864. 1864: "At a time of drought, the daily yield of water from the three major springs, which are all located about six miles from St. John's, was measured. The water from these springs was gathered and piped to a sizable reservoir at Barnes Hill, southwest of St. John's, from where it was dispersed across the city. 12,960 gal. of sawcolts. 20,160 gallons at Mill Hill. 8,640 gal. are from Breaknocks. 1878: Thomas B. Kirwin's 392-acre Mill Hill is depicted in the almanac along with a windmill.

Montero's 
The mill's neighborhood is still referred to as Montero's. The mill, which is in reasonable condition, is located on a hill to the right of Ebeneezer's main road. The mansions in the area almost completely obscure the settlement from view. To pass by the mill, one must detour onto a road that climbs the hill. Giles and Samuel Watkins ask to have the entail broken on a plantation that their deceased father Gyles Watkins, who was originally from England, left them in his will dated 19 January 1702. "George French claimed that Samuel Watkins stabbed one Weatherill to death under the table in cold blood. Due to his participation in the Parke rebellion, he was transported home as a prisoner in 1712. Samuel Watkins of Antigua, Esq., married Mgt. Gamble in 1734, the lone heir to Mrs. Elizabeth Hadden, the sister who owned Dunnings in 1762. 1737: According to a crime record, four slaves robbed a white servant on the roadside close to Montero's mill. In his 1745 "Thomas Watkins Will," the testator reportedly leaves his plantation to be divided into lots, with the slaves being assigned to each lot by the Council and Assembly for virtuous and upright households. The Commander-in-Chief will maintain a home on 10 acres surrounding the mansion. The building and four acres for public use. A school will need two acres. "Monteros contains 250 acres..." John Watkins assigns all of the plantation known as Monteros to Walter Tullideph and Christopher Baldwin in trust for Charles Alexander's use for a century in 1755, while it is in their hands. Samuel Watkins was listed as the owner of 231 acres and 70 slaves in 1780 and appears on the 1777/78 Luffman map. Vere Oliver, however, claims that Ann Watkins This estate had 233 acres and 115 slaves in 1829. The Shands were a Liverpool-based West Indian merchant organization, shipowners, and owners of various estates in Antigua in 1846. In the St. George's parish, Francis Shand wed Lydia Byam, and together they produced 13 kids. Montero's in St. Mary's Parish had 233 acres in 1852. When Thomas D. Foote (Parham Hill for Tudways) was president and E.H. Lane (Weatherills) was colonial secretary in 1858, Dr. W.H. Edwards was nominated to the Legislative Council as the Auditor-General. W. Forrest, a shopkeeper on Scotch Row in St. John's, served as treasurer. On August 5, 1882, a special gathering of the British Medical Association Library took place in St. John's, Antigua. The chairman is Dr. A.G. Mc Hattie. W. E. Edwards, M.D. (Ex-President). Dr. Mapleton of Saint. Kitts read a report about a case of suppurative hemotatoma of the spleen. The group got together the following day for lunch at the American Hotel in St. John's. 1878: According to the Almanac, W.H. Edwards has 283 acres in Montero. Blubber Valley, Bodkins, Cochranes, Diamond, Ffryes, Freemans Upper, Jolly Hill, La Roches, Lavingtons, Long Lane, Looby's, Monteroes, Sandersons Thomas, Yorks, and Bendals Sugar Plant were all held by G.W.B. Bryson & Co. in 1933. Cane Returns for the 1941 Harvest from Antigua Sugar Factory Ltd. Montero. estimated 333 tons, estate acres, peasants labored 37 acres on the estate, and 334 tons of cane were supplied. Gunthorpes Estates Ltd. underwent a restructuring on August 1, 1943 (see #64 Gunthorpes), and was called Antigua Syndicate Estates Ltd. The estates purchased by the Bennet-Bryson family for £39,000 were Sanderson's, Long Lane/Lavington's/Ffryes, Burkes/LaRoche/Willis Freeman's, Jolly Hill (Jolly Hill, Blubber Valley, Ffryes, Montrose*, Yorke's and the Cove), Hawes and Mercer's Creek, Cochranes and Thomas'. There were a total of 17 estates. 1949: The Syndicate commissioned a survey in 1949 due to encroachment, and one Certificate of Title should be created to indicate Creekside and Happy Hill, while another should show Jolly Hill (# 167), Yorks (#183), The Cove, Blubber Valley (#168), Montero's, and part of Ffryes (#118). For 112 slaves, Monteros received £926 1s 11a in compensation. Richard French and Rowland Edward Williams received the honor. Henry Anthony Hardman was the mortgage's beneficiary, but he also failed. Monteros received £926 1s 11a for the freeing of 112 slaves when slavery was abolished in England in 1829. For people who were held as slaves on this property, little is known.

Morris’ 
On the cliff facing the sea beneath the mill, there are still visible stone constructions. a beautiful location. The adjoining small, abandoned quarry clearly demonstrates the region's red clay soil. Morris Bay, a wide beach that stretches south of the headland and offers a decent swimming beach, is located far enough south on the island to avoid being impacted by the winter sea surges. On the side that continues out on the headland to the south is where you'll find the Curtain Bluff Hotel. Nicholas Fuller constructed the Callaloo Hotel, which is now unoccupied and in disarray owing to storm damage and along the beach below the mill. It appears that Nick Fuller may have merely "squatted" on the property or entered into a gentleman's agreement when he built the hotel, as he does not appear to have formal possession, raising ownership concerns.

Valentine Morris, an officer in the unit that would later become the 38th (Stafordshire) Regiment of Foot, arrived in Antigua about the year 1707. This regiment spent more than 60 years in Antigua. Valentine Morris (Val. Morrice), according to the Baker map from 1748, had property in the Old North Sound Division, the Willoughby Bay Division, and the Bermudian Valley. Land was possessed by a Thomas Morris in Nonsuch Division. There are two #181a/b Brookes properties, one in Liberta and one on Old Road on Morris Bay. "Indenture between John Brooks and Christopher Baldwin of London" reads in part in 1777. "Grants all that plantation known as Cades Bay or Road Plantation, containing 350 acres, and all that plantation known as Morris's just purchased of Valentine Morris, containing 400 acres." 300 acres known as "Brambles" are located east of John Brooke and west of Shute Shrimpton Yeamons, according to John Brook Esq. For a period of one year, "John Brooke grants to Christopher Baldwin all that plantation named Morris's, just acquired by Valentine Morris Esq., containing 400 acres and 1 bull, 18 oxen, 21 cows, 3 heifers, 12 calves, and 3 horses on Morris's." Along with Brooks, this estate (Morris') had 744 acres and 207 slaves in 1829. The Antigua Almanac states that Henry Hill owned the 744 acres that Brookes & Morris owned in 1851.

The Lord Nelson Club was established by Nick Fuller Sr. in the late 1940s and is located at Dutchman's Bay on the north shore of Antigua, right opposite to the US Base. Nicholas Fuller Sr. arrived in Antigua in 1941 as the U.S. Vice Consul. "This story about Nick related by his wife Del has always pleased me. Nick was a character and a reprobate about whom anecdotes abound." "Del made the decision that the family needed a cow to supply fresh milk as it expanded to eventually include seven children. So Nick got in touch with a farmer who claimed to have one available. Nick went to check out the animal in the pasture and noticed that it was missing its udders. Dey no be no udda, is one cow me had, the farmer retorted—and it was a bull! When Nick established the Callaloo Hotel on Morris Bay in the 1970s, it did the same as the Lord Nelson Club, which drew a very diverse clientele that included writers, actors, and friends of Nick." Both tourists and locals enjoyed Sunday brunch at this popular location because of the casual setting, rum, and sunsets. The building, which was hidden beneath the slope below the mill site, included three rows of linked rooms with balconies. Visitors would stroll back and forth down the beach to the main complex, which included a bar (all on a help yourself basis) made of red bricks salvaged from a previous plantation site and transported here as ballast in earlier sailing ships. This was at one end of a sizable deck off of which the dining room, kitchens, and common area were constructed. All of these were built to face directly west over the beach to catch the sunsets, but they were also fairly open to the elements and protected from the weather to the east. The common area was adorned with beach driftwood and contained a large library of dog-eared paperback books. The beach has degraded over time, becoming less expansive than it once was, and where there used to be a smooth sand bottom, there are now rocks. Judith Meeker. The Callaloo Cay Resort by Al Caribi Antigua Development, a joint venture between Sheik Tariq Bin Faisal Al Quassimi of Dubai and the Government of Antigua & Barbuda, officially opened its doors in 2017. It spans a 32-acre tract that includes the Morris Bay estate mill's cliff and a section of the beach that was originally the location of the Callaloo Hotel. A five-acre national park will be a part of the project for both visitors and locals.

2,753 17s 10d, including 199 slaves. The recipient was Ann Byam Hill (formerly Wyke), the deceased beneficiary was Daniel Hill, and James Salmon served as the attorney.

New Division 
In this location, there is no longer a mill. It is situated directly on the river in a very gorgeous position with the Sleeping Indian mountains serving as a backdrop, west of Smith's house. The buff house's ruins still serve as a testament to its splendor from long ago. The structure has two floors, with a double staircase in the front leading to the second story and an arch beneath it providing access to the first floor. This house, which is mostly made of stone and has a walled garden, is hidden behind a hill but has views of the sea on the right and the Sleeping Indian mountain range directly in front of it. Although the approach route that avoids Smith's and Seaforth's Estates couldn't have been simple for a horse and carriage to travel to this very distant estate, it was incredibly attractive as it wound over the hills. Today, it still is.

300 acres were granted to Antiguan carpenter Lieutenant William Tremills (d. 1792) in St. Mary's Parish in 1678.

A levy against the Tremills family was recorded in 1693.

The following children appear to have received a portion of the Tremills inheritance.

 2 slaves on William Tremills' 78 acres 
 40 acres, 2 black people, Robert Tremills 
 5 slaves on John Tremills' 136 acres 
 18 acres, 1 black, Elizabeth Tremills
 Matthew Tremills 48 acres, no black people

1716: John Tremills was given Pew Number 16. It is not sure if this relates to a church pew because it was common practice to give different households numbered pews in churches in exchange for titles. No one else is allowed to occupy another's designated pew. This practice of assigning specific pews and numbers to families in the St. John's Cathedral persisted into the 1940s. 1744: Lucy Thibou, who passed away in that year, bought "Tremills," which she later gave to Dr. W. Tullideph upon his marriage. Dr. Walter Tullideph, Antigua c.1726, was the owner of the "New Division" and "Musketo Cove" plantations in 1794. 1737: "Dr. Sydsderfe has bought the estate at Five Islands belonging to John Martin and John Manwaring." When Alexander Middleton visited Boston a while back. 29 May 1738: "Dr. Young buys Dabron's estate." Old Tomlinson passed away in 1739, "about eight days ago; he died suddenly of fits." For 450 pounds stirling, John Watkins rented The Judges in 1742. Mrs. Shepherd had acquired Henry Osborne's estate in 1744 and paid 10,500 for it as well as 30 slaves. "I sent 8 hogsheads of sugar to Col. Samuel Martin in Bristol in 1746. I had been working for him for nearly 15 years when I arrived on the island. I also sent some to Mrs. Mary Sydeserfe in Bath." To Mrs. Eliz. Gamble of Cork, in 1746. "I recently came upon a letter from Mr. Samuel Lyons to a friend in which he recalls buying Golden Grove from you for 1,200 Irish pounds". 1741 - "Deaths of Thomas Hanson and Dr. Young on September 25." "Dr. Dunbar's death on February 5" In 1755, Walter Tulideph was permitted to work on the nearby estate Monteroes. There are 250 acres in Monteroes, which is in the New Division of Antigua. John Watkins assigns all of the plantation known as Monteros to Walter Tullideph and Christopher Baldwin in trust for Charles Alexander's use for a century in 1755, while it is in their hands. August 30, 1755: "My New Division estate, which includes the lands formerly owned by William Yorke, Samuel Martin, and Tremills, is for Polly." 144 slaves and 236 acres were Walter Tulideph's rating in 1767, and 325 acres were his estate in 1785. Mary Smith was assessed for 160 acres and 59 slaves in 1780 (she also owned "Smiths"). "In trust all my "New Division" estate," according to Walter Tullideph's will, "including the estates formerly owned by Tremills & Devereux and the properties purchased from Mr. William York and Capt. Sam Martin. I have agreed to sell Mr. Morris of Antigua my "Musketo Cove" estate for $18,000 and to give Dame Charlotte Ogilvy, Sir John Ogilvy's first son, ownership of all of my holdings for life. Sir John Ogilvie had an illicit relationship with a family member named Molly around 1800, who was later discovered to be pregnant by her lover, a youngster by the name of Martin. Despite the fact that the other participants in the conspiracy were prosecuted, Molly and her kid remained to reside on the Estate while she planned the murder of Sir Ogilvie. Mary Smith Will (1804) passed away in 1806. My plantation, "New Division," in trust for my sister Sarah Smith, was given to Jas Nibbs & Thos. Kerby of Antigua, Esq., to receive the rents and eventually sell. 1823: R.H. Jefferson, wine and spirits merchants from Whitehaven, Antigua plantations, including Walter Tulidelph's will from 1767, William Ogilvie's estate inventory from 1823, Dame Charlotte Ogilvy's estate inventory from 1810, and other documents pertaining to estates in Antigua. In addition to York's wealth, this estate had 404 slaves and 1059 acres in 1829. 1861: Unaccounted-for cash expenditures and returns for the estates of York, New Division, and Yeaman.

A section of Robert Jefferson's letter to his brother from April 1861 includes a report about New Division.

"New Division - I had hoped ten days ago that I had sold to McGuire for 1,000 GBP Cash to be sent up as soon as I finished crop, leaving him one piece of extremely late Canes, but after visiting the Estate I'm sorry to say I got the accompanying note — He is absolutely correct; there isn't even a cart on the Estate (it uses one of Yorks), and although I don't mean to imply that he may not yet be the buyer from the tenor of his note, he spoke to Nugent yesterday in less than favorable terms. Nevertheless, he has cash, so I must never lose sight of him with regard to." June 1961. "We shall continue grinding all off here at ND save the very late portion alluded to earlier and will conclude, I trust, with equivalent to 34 to 35 hhds. At ND the sprouts appear well and promising and apparently in better heart."

Robert Dobson's 243-acre New Division is listed in the 1878 Almanac as his property. 1921: 240 acres. Cane Returns for the 1941 Crop from Antigua Sugar Factory Ltd. New Division. estimated 912 tons, - acres of the estate were occupied by peasants, and 781 tons of cane were delivered. For 309 slaves, New Division received £4,549 5s 10d in compensation. Henry and Robert Jefferson received awards.

Orange Valley 
The Orange Valley mill is indicated on the 1933 Camacho map as being on a tiny knoll right behind Dead Sands (Darkwood) on the opposite side of the marsh. After clearing the area, it is possible to see that a road circles up toward the mill from the bottom. The dungeon is a small cut stone building constructed into the rock beneath the mill that was used to house disobedient slaves. It has four stairs going up to an arched entry that is surrounded by two tiny apertures and is in superb shape. A rock-hewn cave is shown when it opens. Only a few remaining "dungeons" are known to exist on the island, hence it is important to conserve this location historically. The footprints of a comparable building near the entrance are still visible, but there are no remaining stone walls in the identical cave that was on the west side.

This little knoll in the middle of the valley offers a breathtaking view of Dead Sands (Darkwood). In the past 15 years, the beach has undergone a significant transformation as the sand has moved from the northern end by the bridge to the southern end by the Darkwood bar. "A great old tamarind tree north of the bridge, where there used to be a large stretch of beach but is now entirely made up of rocks, was one of our favorite picnic locations when we were kids in the 1940s and 1950s." The tall coconut trees that once lined the shore are now reduced to just one or two. Sand mining, hurricanes, and tides all have an impact.

Up until the 1960s, duck and pigeon shooting was good in the swamp below. The majority of the marsh plant life and flora vanished as a result of the dredging for sand, which radically altered the way this area used to look by exposing a large area of water.

The Pigotts have transformed Orange Valley into a campground for individuals or church groups. Although there is no longer a mill at this location, Mrs. Pigott was told that there were still old walls and gear that belonged to a mill that processed limes at the foot of the hill. It is in a stunning location, tucked up in the hills nearby. You enter the area from the side facing Dead Sands (Darkwood), then you ascend through the valley on the right. On the left is Willocks.

"Indenture dated March 7th, 1763, between the Hon. Lesslie, formerly of Antigua but now of Youngsbury, Herts, and Sarah Lessly, his wife, on the one hand, and William Livingston, formerly of Antigua but now of Gerrard Street, Soho, on the other hand, grants William Livingston ownership of the entire plantation in the Parish of St. Mary and division of Bermudian Valley, Antigua, containing 450 acres, etc." 1763: "1763 March 16. The Hon. Andrew Lesslie has rented his estate after being gone for three years and is most likely not coming back." The Charming Sally's captain, Capt. Andrew Lessley (d. 1780), sold William Livingston 450 acres in St. Mary's Parish in 1763. William Livingston acquired 450 acres in Bermudian Valley, Sandy Valley of 35 acres, Crab Valley or Courages of 110 acres from Andrew Lessley in 1763 for L.24,000 along with 84 men, 92 women, 24 boys, 41 girls, and stock. William Livingston rated in St. Mary's parish in 1790 on 735 acres with 196 slaves. This estate had 735 acres and 98 slaves in 1829. 1852: Dr. Kean Osborn owned Orange Valley, which covered 735 acres in St. Mary's, Bodkins, which covered 412 acres in St. Paul's, Rooms, which covered 318 acres in St. Paul's, Paynters, which covered 272 acres, and Carlisles, which covered 388 acres in St. Georges. 1878: According to the almanac, C.J. Manning owned 1,293 acres in Orange Valley and Ffry's. 1921: 707 acres in 1921. Orange Valley: Cane Returns for the 1941 Harvest from Antigua Sugar Plant Ltd. Estimated 114 tons of cane were delivered out of an estate with - tons, - acres, and - acres of villagers. For 100 slaves, Orange Valley received 1803 lsd 0s 8d. Success came to Keane Brown Osborne. John Brown and Alicia Osborne failed in their endeavors.

Picard’s 
There isn't a mill there anymore, and not much is known about this estate. Abraham Picard de la Ferte, the original owner, is one of the few Frenchmen to have purchased and settled in Antigua. The property is located behind Dead Sands, to the south of the swamp that once belonged to the Orange Valley estate (Darkwood) This neighborhood began to be developed as a residential area in 2012.

Rigby's 
This mill stands out because it is the only one on the island that has "striped" stones that alternate between dark and bright colors. Before Smith's, on a little climb, is Rigby's, which is located on the left side of the main road. A little higher up the slope would have been the buff and works.

"Indenture in 1755 between Richard Rigby dec. for the consideration of 2,400 pounds for the absolute purchase of the plantation... including 286 acres," reads the document. Perry's was once Rigby's. 1759: James Doig received land at Rigby's in New North Sound, Antigua, West Indies, as an inheritance from his aunt (Ann Doig Franklyn). dated on February 1, 1759. James Doig (20 February 1758 – 1807) received Rigby's 1788 in 1758. John Hurst Doig (1793–1833) was the heir of Rendezvous Bay. 1829: William Henry Doig (b. 17 May 1795) became the new owner of Rigby's. During the time, it had 110 slaves and 295 acres. This estate had 110 slaves and 295 acres in 1829. Mr. G.S. Martin owned Mount Pleasant in St. John's parish in 1852. The heirs of Samuel Martin possessed High Point 212 acres and Nibbs 131 acres in St. George's Parish, while Sir. W. Martin controlled Green Castle 605 acres and Rigby's 263 acres in St. Mary's Parish. 1852: Sir W. Martin held 236 acres of land known as Rigby's. 1867: According to the Antigua Horsford Almanac, Fryer's Concrete Company was renting out Rigby's of 263 acres, which belonged to the Heirs of J. Law. Cane Returns for the 1941 Harvest from Antigua Sugar Factory Ltd. Regby (Rigby). estimated 700 tons, estate with 55 acres given to peasants, and cane supplied in tons numbering 538. For 22 slaves, Rigby's Estate received £278 1s 9a. William Henry Doig, Henry Mouton Dyer, and Joseph Liggins were the honorees. John Adams Wood and Alexander Coates' "other association" were the beneficiaries of the death.

Sage Hill 
Historical maps depict Tom Moore's Old Mill, of Tom Moore's Spring fame, close to this location. In Antigua, water has long been a vital resource, making the few springs there incredibly valuable. John Salmond, a Scottish immigrant to Antigua in 1730 who acquired the plantations Sage Hill and Slamond's, was the only child of Captain James Salmond (1694–1746). The first family to settle in Antigua was the Welsh-born Williams family in 1629. The first white male to be born on the island was his son Roland Williams in 1630. 1748: At Road Division, Edward Williams, "Tom Moore's" Plantation of 150 acres and 50 acres, The "Cistern" Plantation of 150 acres, and The "Road" Plantation of 954 1/2 acres, all of which were surveyed on September 19, 1743. 1748: The "Road," "Tom Moores," and "Cistern" plantations were left to Rowland Williams (b.1748–1826). Edward Williams, who passed away in 1784, was the owner of the "Road" and "Body" plantations (with 600 pounds and 200 pounds in charges, respectively). To my trustees I give my three St. Mary's Parish properties, the "Road," "Upper" or "Tom Moores," and the "Cistern," all in trust for Rowland Edward Williams and his heirs. Mrs. Rachel Russell owned "Cistern," a 120-acre property bordered by "Tom Moores," "Road Plantation," and "Gardiner's." "James Gilchrist widow," 1794. Will from March 25, 1794. For my daughters Lydia, Mary, Cath, Eliz, and Janet Gilchrist, all slaves are held in trust. By virtue of a deed I have with my son William Gilchrist, I grant my aforementioned five daughters, along with all the furniture and plate, 1000 pounds charged on Sage Hill. "Tom Moore's" plantation, which was referred to in the 1806 indenture, included 170 acres and was bordered to the east by Mr. Yeamans (#176 Mill Hill), the south by Rowland Williams (#177 Claremont), and to the west by Col. John Huyghue, North James Salmond, and Ashton Warner. 1829: This Estate had 103 slaves in 1829. There is no mention of the area. The 162 acre Sage Hill, which belonged to D.C. Odlum and was rented to T.B. Kirwan, is listed in the 1878 Almanac. Sawcolts & Sage Hill Cane Returns for the 1941 Crop from Antigua Sugar Factory Ltd. 500 tons estimated, - acres of farmland, - acres of peasants on the farm, and 755 tons of cane supplied. For 125 slaves, Sage Hill was given 1763 lsd 6 s 5 d. The only winner was John Adams Wood.

Sawcolt’s 
The very black stone that made up the mill is disintegrating. It was constructed of a very black volcanic stone, which was typical for the majority of the mills on Antigua, and is presently used as a goat corral. Thomas Sawcolt requests 10 acres from Mr. John Ducoster, which are limited to the south by property that was once Mr. Richard Cheshire's, to the east by Widow Byam's former property, to the north by Mr. Elliott, and to the west by Mr. Preston. Will Col. John Sawcolt of Sawcolts Road and Sawcolts Body in St. Mary's in 1746. His estates were left to his six daughters. Sawcolts Road was built by Messrs. Dean & Adney in the east, Lockhart Russell & John Gilchrist in the south, and George Byam in the west and north. "Sawcolts Body" was written by Thomas Warner and Daniel Mathew, "E. by heirs of Rowland Oliver dec., N. by Thomas Warner, W. by Daniel Mathew, and S. by Daniel Mathew previously the estate of John Sawcolt dec. In his will dated December 31, 1748, John Sawcolt, Esq., left his whole estate, both real and personal, to his six daughters. both equally. The Body was underlet for 120 pounds per year, and Sawcolts and The Body plantation rented for 900 pounds per year. "Mary Ann Sawcolt, a spinster," 1759. Will dated September 13, 1759. A mulatto worth 50c pounds was given to my nephew John Burton. For a ring, etc., to my nephew John Horsford, 10c pounds. John Sawcolt of the "Sawcolt's Road" and "Sawcolt's Body" plantations in St. Mary's and St. John's Division, respectively. Capt. of Militia, 1706; Member of Assembly, 1712; buried at Saint. John's on January 2, 1748. Will dated November 30, 1746. His estates were passed down to his six daughters. Unknown acreage in 1829; 103 slaves. James Gilchrist owns it. Had 333 acres and 178 slaves in 1829. belonging to Mary Russell. The Water Commissioners own Sawcolt's 235 acres, according to the 1878 Almanac. Sawcolts & Sage Hill Cane Returns for the 1941 Crop from Antigua Sugar Factory Ltd. 500 tons estimated, - acres of farmland, - acres of peasants on the farm, and 755 tons of cane supplied. 1783: "Letter dated July 15 from Edward Horne, Esq., with his petition to Lord North stating that he turned 21 on December 4, 1771, and shortly thereafter, from extravagance, dissipated his property and in August 1722, had to sell his reversion of one-tenth of Sawcolts, to which he was to succeed after his mother's death. The petitioner's first cousin, John Horsford, was the estate's lessee, and his lease was set to end in 1783. He offered 300 pounds for his one-tenth portion. After spending some time living with Thomas Warner, the Attorney-General, the petitioner was admitted to practice law in 1778 and filed a chancery suit against Horseford in 1782. His one-tenth of the estate, which had a total value of 15,000 pounds, was at least 1,500 pounds. Petitioner lost his case and is now appealing against Horseford, who defrauded him by utilizing his youth and inexperience. The management of Sawcolts ordered the boiling-house cleared for the people to congregate at midday in 1820. From there, they went to Sawcolts. 1829: This estate had 234 acres and 72 slaves in 1829. 1852: Robert Horsford owned the 234-acre property in 1852. The Leeward Islands' Hon. Paul Horsford Attorney General served in 1820. When you approach Falmouth, Horsford Hill still bears the name of this family.

1864: "At a time of drought, the daily yield of water from the three major springs, which are all located about six miles from St. John's, was measured. The water from these springs was gathered and piped to a sizable reservoir at Barnes Hill, southwest of St. John's, from where it was dispersed across the city.

 Sawcolts – 12,960 gals. 
 Mill Hill – 20,160 gals. 
 Breaknocks – 8,640 gals.”

Slavery was eventually outlawed in the British Caribbean, Mauritius, and the Cape in 1833 by an act of Parliament. While the slave trade was outlawed in 1807, it took another 26 years for the enslaved to be freed. It was believed that plantation owners should get compensation for their slaves' upcoming freedom, which led to the law of 1833. Twenty million pounds, a significant sum in those days, were split among all slave owners. Samuel Nelson, George Horsford, and John Athill, who are recipients of the honor. John and Paul Horsford were unsuccessful. 767 943 11s 9d Antigua 285/752/756 (Sawcolts) (71 enslaved). view 378 42 8s 6d. view 375 13 0s 9d. (1 enslaved) (4 enslaved).

Seaforth’s 
"While I've been told that there are worked stones in the wilderness, this location no longer has a mill. At the middle of the 1800s, this estate switched to steam. The flashes, which are a part of the drainage system that extends all the way from Body Ponds, form the northern boundary of Seaforth's. Smith's is to the east, New Division is to the south, and the sea is to the west. The abundance of seafood in this region, which included fish in the water and cockles and conch in the seagrass, must have been astounding." The Hall family owns Maiden Island, which sits in the middle of the bay and is used for camping vacations. The bay is quite safe and shallow. The "Sleeping Indian," which is a stunning region overall, is directly up to the south. There are two entrances to the estate: a low road that runs alongside the marsh and is frequently submerged these days at high tide, and a high road that ascends the hill and passes New Division. This estate must have been considered very far away from St. John's, the city's capital, in the days of the horse and buggy. "Went to Casamajor's Estate this evening. Because it was my first visit, I went to the manager as per routine. He welcomed me with great kindness and provided an amazing testimonial to the influence of godliness among the people, the most of whom are Society members. He noted that the estate hardly ever hears the crack of the whip. married seven couples, some of them were graying together and others holding children.

"William Salmond rated on 306 acres with 177 slaves in 1767, and on 456 acres with 242 slaves in 1780. Mid-1800s: A man of color named David Cranstoun oversaw Seaforths for Justinian Casamajor (whose daughter Mary married J.P. Anderdon) and other plantations during this time. He also served as the Power of Attorney for Anderdon and William Manning, the former head of the Bank of England who went bankrupt (company of William Manning, Fredrick & John Proctor Anderdon). He went by the name of "Justice" Cranstoun. and in St. John's Cathedral, next to the Church, behind the fence, both he and his brother George are interred. Later, the Cranstoun family acquired the estates of Potter (#47), Cochrane (#138), and Thomas (#139). 1829: This estate had 163 slaves and 622 acres in 1829. Jeremy Casamajor (d.1843). To ensure payment of Casamajor's debts to William Manning, John Proctor Anderson, Frederick Manning, and John Lavicount Anderdon, a mortgage assignment of £4,000 was made on the Seaforths plantation. "Justinian Casamajor" is the artist's signature. From 1794 until Anderdon's retirement in 1816, Manning & Anderdon were merchants in London. possessed a number of estates in Antigua. Slavery was eventually outlawed in the British Caribbean, Mauritius, and the Cape in 1833 by an act of Parliament. While the slave trade was outlawed in 1807, it took another 26 years for the enslaved to be freed. It was believed that plantation owners should get compensation for their slaves' upcoming freedom, which led to the law of 1833. Twenty million pounds, a significant sum in those days, were split among all slave owners. The 1878 Almanac lists Edgar H. Lane as the owner of the 622-acre Seaforth, which is classed as a Steamworks. He was also the owner of Weatherill's (#5). 1921: 400 acres in 1921. Cane Returns for the 1941 Harvest from Antigua Sugar Plant Ltd. Seaforths. estimated 600 tons, acre estate, acre farm, tons of cane delivered 452, and acres of farmland. 2015 will see the growth of Seaforths, which has been classified as a tourist site.

Smith's 
As Robert Hall used the stones to lay the foundation for the Halls' house at Smith's, there is no longer a mill at this location. One of the island's few surviving working estates, it raises cattle, sheep, and goats for the market. The legacy that Robert Hall left behind has been given fresh life by his grandson Adrian Hall and his family through The Hall Valley Farm. They have been increasing their stock and currently provide pesticide-free farm-raised hens, eggs, lamb, and pork in addition to experimenting with cheese and bacon. Smith's estate includes Darby's & Cashew Hill (under Misc. Estates towards the back). Darby's Cave is another place where the name Darby appears. This sinkhole, which is about  miles northeast of Codrington Village, has been 30 feet undercut to resemble a cave. The crater measures 350 feet in diameter and the rocks are 70 feet high.

Henry Smith receives a 100-acre grant in 1668. Moreover, records indicate that in 1679 or 1680, Ensign Robert Smith bought land in Rendezvous Bay. Also, Sarah Smith's sister Mary Smith had a nearby estate called "New Division" that was placed in trust after Mary Smith's death. Wavell Smith complains that he has probably lost all of his belongings in 1723 despite the fact that his wife was on one of the ships in the harbor during the hurricane and made it safely ashore after a lull. Mary Smith was mentioned as a niece in Mrs. Elizabeth Haddon's testament from 1756, née Gamble, who gave the "Smiths" 122 acres in St. Mary's Parish to Alderman Richard Oliver in 1772. "William Smith of Grenada, Esq., co-heir to his cousin Alderman R. Oliver 1784 and to his uncle Wavell 1755." "grants to Richard Oliver and his heirs forever all that plantation in the Parish of St. Mary's, Antigua, containing 122 acres, called "Smiths," abutting N on the lands now or previously owned by George Moncrieff and W. of Nesbit Darby & Samuel Watkins," according to an indenture signed in 1772 by Mary Smith and Richard Oliver. Mary Smith was rated on 160 acres with 59 slaves in 1780. According to an indenture from April 1972 between Mary Smith of Golden Square, a spinster, and Richard Oliver and his heirs, "Mary Smith grants to Richard Oliver and his heirs forever all that plantation in the Parish of St. Mary's, Antigua, containing 122 acres called Smith's in consideration of 5/-Mary Smith." 1829: This estate had 170 acres and 64 slaves in 1829. After slavery was abolished, Richard Wesston Nanton held the position of Chief Judge in Antigua. He was successful in his claim for a smaller claim of three people but unsuccessful in his demand for recompense for Smith's estate. 797 L.39 0s 7d. in Antigua. The Shands were a Liverpool-based West Indian mercantile organization, shipowners, and estate owners in Antigua in 1846. In the St. George's parish, Francis Shand wed Lydia Byam, and together they produced 13 kids. Anna Doig in 1872. Doigs, who are of Scottish ancestry, have been in Antigua since the early 1700s. Next next to Smith's was Rigby's (#162), which was held by James Rigby (d. 1759), and Doig's is an estate on Rendezvous Bay, close to Falmouth. Vere Oliver Vol. I lists an indenture between Ann Doig and James Gordon dated July 15, 1874, but it's unclear whether Ann and Anna are the same person. 1878: According to the almanac, J.W. Foriscou (Fonesca) held Smith's, Darby's, New Division, and Cashew Hill, which totaled 110 acres.

Tranquil Vale 
Just south of the Bolans village, there are these two estates right next to one another. The estate of Rose is close by. "As a mark of love/No length of time can alter this stone," reads the ledger over the brick crypt in St. John's Churchyard. is placed over a devoted husband who has abandoned a widow and seven children, who mourn a loss that cannot be made up for. John Rose was born on February 12, 1798, and passed away on August 19, 1838. 1829: This estate had 109 acres and 57 slaves in 1829. The 67-acre Tranquil Vale is shown as being owned by the Heirs of G. Black in the 1878 Almanac.

Tranquil Vale & Tottenham Park 
The Tottenham Park Estate, which was also owned by Angelo Barreto, included the Sugar Ridge development. The Willocks Estate did not own it. Aside from the fact that the estate held 57 slaves just before slavery was outlawed in the Caribbean.

Tremontaine / The Mountain 
When you get closer to Clairmont, which is tucked away in the hills to the east, you can see the mill, which is still in existence, from the Fig Tree Drive road. It is currently challenging to climb to this mill site since so many fences have appeared during the past 12 years on the island especially in this particular area.

George Crump (d. 1793) received the 120 acres of Crump's Mountain estate in Old Road from his uncle Dr. George Crump (d. 1761). George and Nathaniel Crump of Middlesex have sold “Crump’s Mountain Plantation, Crump’s Windward Plantation and Crump’s Steel Plantation, all in Antigua, to Andrew Newton of London. 1711: "Nathaniel Crump reported 1711 February 21 that on October 10th, three French privateers landed at his farm and seized fifteen slaves. He receives a 661-pound payment from the government on May 22 for those. The Mountain was jointly owned by the Williams family and Claremont until 1878, when Thomas W. Shand became its owner.

The Codrington family wrote to Alexander Brodie in 1777 to inform him that they had sold the estate Folly's or The Mountain.

"Rowland Edward Louis Charles Williams, Antigua's Puisne Baron of Exchequer and Member of Council. Captain 10th Hussars; born in April 1784; buried at St. Mary's on June 2, 1852, at age 68. His ancestral home was known as "Claremont.""

1829: This estate (Claremont), along with The Mountain, included 252 slaves and 938 acres in 1829. Rowland E. Williams owns the 938-acre "Mountain" in St. Mary's Parish. Along with Claremont, this Estate had 938 acres and 252 slaves in 1829. The Antigua Almanac lists Mountain & Claremont as Rowland E. Williams' 938-acre property in 1851.

Tuck’s / Farley Bay 
The only thing that is known about this plantation is that Hon. John Laforey was the owner of it.

Willock’s 
In this location, there is no longer a mill. To reach Willocks, turn left off the main road just past the exit for Ffry's Beach, past Tranquil Vale, and continue up the valley past the slave dungeon. The stone driveway is lined with a ragged avenue of eucalyptus trees that have weathered the ages.

The home at Willocks wasn't always there, but it could have been constructed there because it commanded a stunning view of the valley below. Cows are grazing peacefully at the ancient coppers that are filled with water and lying in the fields.

1834: "Frank Gore Willock, Esq., Capt. R.N., at Bushire. This officer was a native of the West Indies." The rest of the story is extremely detailed and describes his escapades. There is also a 133-acre plantation in the same division (St. Mary's, Bermudian Valley), with Samuel Frye E and the top of the Great Mountains in the N, S, and W. Ann Willock wed George Savage Martin on October 21, 1823. 1829: This estate had 368 acres and 102 slaves in 1829. 513 slaves lived in 1821. Willocks Spyes received 1450 pounds 7s 7d in compensation for 98 slaves. Francis Shand was the beneficiary and William Shand was the awardee. 1852: Mrs. Ann Willock possessed the 1852 acres that made up Willocks. The iron railings that encircle the ancient Courthouse, now the Museum of Antigua & Barbuda, were created by St. John's ironmonger Frank Gore Willock (b.1828 d.1902). Jean Thomas, née Willock. William Richard Abbott was employed in 1883 at Cedar Hill and in 1885 at Yorks. While Henckell DuBuisson owned Five Islands estate in London, a stock farm, he served as an overseer there. After William Richard's passing, Mary Emily Abbott leased Five Islands and stayed there for a long time. "Esteemed he was by all; by all approved; died lamented as he lived cherished; in the midst of life we are at death," is how his MI is written on his tombstone. Willocks and Upper Ffryes, both 518 acres, are listed in the 1878 Almanac as belonging to Richard Abbott's heirs. Cane Returns for the 1941 Crop from Antigua Sugar Plant Ltd. Willocks. Expected 600 tons, - acres of farmland, - acres of villagers on the farm, and 326 tons of cane provided in 2007. Marie Barreto, who received her parents' estate as an inheritance, writes warmly of growing up "in the country," of roaming at will, riding horses, and gathering and enjoying the many fruits in season, notably mangoes, of which Willocks has a variety. She has pleasant memories of the sugar cane plantations and the frequent train service that she experienced while traveling through Bolands with her father and sister to collect the cut sugar cane from the nearby farms. On the estate, livestock are still raised, and there are lots of fruit trees. She also claimed that there were two grave markers in one of the paddocks north of the current home, close to an ancient tamarind tree, but she was unable to recall the names they were meant to honor. Two Amerindian artifacts were recently discovered on the land, and Dr. Reg Murphy was invited to inspect them in case the location was a significant historic site. Reg examined the area where they had been discovered but was unable to make out any other elements that would have supported an Amerindian site. He thus concluded that they had likely been transported from the very old Stone Age site at Jolly Harbour, which has been dated to 1775 BC. They are currently in the hands of John Fuller, who amassed a sizable collection of relics from the Amerindian people.

Yorke’s 
As seen by the quotes below taken from excerpts from some of the Tullideph Letters, it appears that "Muskito Cove" and "Bear Gardens" combined to become one estate now known as "Yorke's" when owned by William Ogilvie and Walter Tullideph. West of York's Mill, close to Pearne's Point and Mount Pearne, was also a portion of the land.

Capt. John Lingham, who passed away in 1685, took control of the plantations Blubber Valley and Musqueto Cove. ” "In 1688, Kathryn Lingham rated on 850 acres and 78 slaves." Ambrose York was rated in 1688 on 6 slaves and 20 acres, 13 slaves and 220 acres, 12 slaves and 152 acres, and 56 slaves and 138 acres on 7 June 1706. Archibald Cochran, the Surveyor General of Antigua, and Thomas Conoway received 100 acres in 1669. Thomas Yorke was given 20 acres by Governor Warner and Tropic Bird Island by Governor Williams in 1676. John Everard sells 10 acres to Thomas Yorke in 1672. Ambrose York received a rating of 6 slaves and 20 acres in 1692. 1696 saw 13 slaves and 220 acres, while 1706 had 56 slaves and 138 acres. Ambrose Pierre York of Antigua, the heir and second son, enlists in the troop in 1718; he entrusted Valentine Morris Esq. with the mortgage of his estates. Will dated June 5, 1931; sworn October 12. Robert Pearne owned Musketo Cove, which had 60 acres, and Blubber Valley, which had 1200 acres. 1738: This Estate, along with "New Division," comprised 404 slaves and 1059 acres in 1852. Ambrose Perrie Yorke, who passed away in 1738, mortgaged his estates to Valentine Morris, Esq., in 1738. In 1743, 600 acres belonged to Robert Pearne. (Valentine Morris owns the southern boundary with York). Gedney Bispham served as Yorke's manager in 1845. (Tim Anderson) 1852: This estate (Yorke's), which included New Division, had 1059 acres and 404 slaves in 1852. 1878: According to the atlas, Mrs. Margaret McGuire has a 325-acre York estate with a windmill. 1861: Robert Jefferson and his brother corresponded about Yorks in April 1861. "Yorke's — I agree with you that 50 poorly planted acres of canes on such a property will not give more loss than half the quantity well done. However, I am unable to see the estate at this time. I see from the statement you sent me that it has lost us 856 pounds sterling at the end of 10 years, and the buildings and stock have depreciated by a full 1,000 pounds sterling, not to mention the increased destitution of the soil. — don't say I'm taking a pessimistic view of things because the boiling house needs to be rebuilt from top to bottom and Nugent says that at least one million pounds are needed to get the estate in full working order with stock, etc. — so what am I to do but accept a very low price for it if I can get it?" 1861: June 1861 The sprouts here look very middling despite the rain, and they have bunched very badly, demonstrating more forcefully than ever the poverty of the soil. "I have ridden over since my last," the farmer said. "At the former we have been forced to stop cutting Plant Canes because they have sprung & are growing & would scarcely make sugar so 19 acres will lay over for a couple of months and 21 acres ratoons will be gone with." "The first bank and gallows in Antigua were both constructed in Yorks many years ago. One of the most well-known slave massas, Massa Shan, obtained permission to hire the Portuguese as indentured servants. The Peking Chinese and a few other Chinese arrive from Shanghai and ask for our assistance in eliminating the kooka bendals because they were the ones who constructed pit latrines in Antigua originally. The last Chinese man I know used to lay out some of the sidewalks in St. John's; he was a government retiree for a while." 1930s: "My great uncle Darnel Webster served as the estate's manager at the time and rode a white horse to accomplish his daily rounds of the property. He was known as "the White Ghost" because he had the capacity to appear anywhere on the estate at any time. He would lurk in the bushes by the tenants to listen in on the conversations in order to discover out who was stealing the ground supply. One night, one of the "plotters" went to the bushes close to where Darnel was hiding to urinate himself. However, he was unable to identify himself and endured a thorough "wet-up" in silence." Gunthorpes Estates Ltd. underwent a restructuring on August 1st, 1943 (see #64 Gunthorpes), and was called Antigua Syndicate Estates Ltd. The Bennet-Bryson estates, which cost 39,000 pounds, included Sandersons, Long Lane/Lavingtons/Ffryes, Burkes/LaRoche/Willis Freemans, Jolly Hill (Jolly Hill, Blubber Valley, Ffryes, Montrose, Yorke's and the Cove), Hawes and Mercer's Creek, Cochranes and Thomases. Yorke's received 2342 lsd 2 s 0 d in compensation for 146 slaves. The honorees were Henry and Robert Jefferson.

Young’s 
In this location, there is no longer a mill. Sarah Young, a widow, and her kids received a 200-acre grant in 1685. John Farley and his wife Rebecca sell 32 acres in Falmouth to William Young, a surgeon from Antigua, for 500 pounds sterling. The Sir William Young, Bart. estate was valued in 1780 at 325 slaves and 655 acres. The Calliaqua in St. Vincent and the 3000-acre Pembroke in the Valley of Buccament, both three miles from Kingston, were among Sir William's plantations. The Louis d'Or Estate near Queen's Bay in Tobago. Half a mile from Old Road Bay in Antigua, he was the owner of the Old Road Plantation. "Nanton pedigree. Nanton, John Dearman, in 1728. Major Thomas Nanton's grandson. Margaret Nanton, who wed William Young, M.D., in 1720, and gave birth to Young, who would later become a Bart, was most likely his mother. 201 acres and 124 slaves were owned in St. Mary's Parish in 1767. "In St. Mary's Parish, The Hon. William Young rated on 283 slaves and 460 acres." Sir William Young, Bart, was assessed in 1780 based on 325 slaves and 655 acres. 1829: This estate had 573 acres and 97 slaves in 1829. 1852: In St. Mary's Parish, the "Young's" Old Road. John Dawson owned the 573-acre property in 1852.

Young’s /Nanton’s 
The mill is in reasonably good condition. "Pedigree of Nanton," 1728. Nanton, John Dearman, in 1728. Major Thomas Nanton's grandson. Margaret Nanton, who wed William Young, M.D., in 1720, and gave birth to Young, who would later become a Bart, was most likely his mother. 1767: In St. Mary's Parish, possessed 201 acres and 124 slaves in 1767. "In St. Mary's Parish, The Hon. William Young rated on 283 slaves and 460 acres." Sir William Young, Bart, was valued at 325 slaves and 655 acres in 1780. In St. Mary's Parish, there is a very modest estate called Nanton's. It had 76 acres and belonged to James Scotland's heir in 1852. John Fry purchases 12 acres from George Nanton in 1667. Robert Nanton of Antigua owned land in 1677. Will made in 1728 at the English Harbour plantation by Thomas Nanton. In St. Mary's Parish in 1767, "John Dearman Nanton had 201 acres and 125 slaves." Will of Ashton Warner, dated 1750. Nevertheless, none of the slaves purchased with Staughtons, nor any of the plantations recently acquired called Nanton's or Dimsdales, nor any of the three black people I withdrew from there and placed on Staughtons. Oliver Nugent of Council of Antigua informs Sir Ralph Payne in March 1773 that he "some years since sold all property in Antigua and settled at Dominica." 1829: This estate had 76 acres and 63 slaves in 1829. Nanton's received 852 lsd 0s 3d in compensation for 56 slaves. The honorees were John Willing Warren and Henry Samuel Eyre. Over time, the number of slaves employed at this estate decreased from about 125 in the 1700s to just 63 by the time slavery was outlawed. In 1829, Nanton's received 852 lbs, 0 s, and 3 d for 56 slaves. For people who were held as slaves there, little is known.

Geography
The parish's and Antigua and Barbuda's highest point is Boggy Peak, originally known as Mount Obama. As the Shekerley Mountains dominate the parish, the majority of residents reside in the parish's northern, flatter region, which is home to the capital city of Bolands, or near the coast.

Education
With 1,679 people of school age participating in full-time education in the parish, 27.59% of the population in 2011 according to the census.

Demographics

As of 2011, 201 persons, or 2.74% of the population, have experienced some type of crime, with housebreaking accounting for 50% of all crimes in the parish. Only 33.01% of homes had access to the internet. Cable TV and satellite TV were available to 78.93% and 1.36% of households, respectively. Only 9.67% of households in Saint Mary are overcrowded, which is the second-lowest percentage nationwide. One of the lowest percentages of people countrywide, 2.60 percent, have a disability. 1,660 immigrants, or 22.8% of the population, reside in the parish.

Administrative breakdown and locations
Towns

 Bolands-Jolly Harbour
 Bishops
 Tre' Philip
 Cades Bay
 Cedar Hall
 Claremont
 Crabs Hill
 Ebenezer
 Glebe
 Jennings
 John Hughes
 Johnsons Point
 New Division
 Old Road
 Orange Valley Mill
 Sawcolts
 Seaforths
 Urlings
 Yorks

Notable people
 Hamish Anthony - Cricketer
 James Carlisle - 2nd Governor-General
 George Ferris - Cricketer
 Gayson Gregory - Football player
 Andy Roberts - Cricketer
 Joseph Matthew Sebastian - Caribbean trade union leader and member of the Legislative Council of Saint Kitts-Nevis-Anguilla.
 Janiel Simon - Football player
 Gavin Williams - Cricketer

References

 
Parishes of Antigua and Barbuda
Antigua (island)